The 2016 Buriram Superbike World Championship round was the second round of the 2016 Superbike World Championship. It took place over the weekend of 11–13 March 2016 at the Chang International Circuit.

Championship standings after the round

Superbike Championship standings after Race 1

Superbike Championship standings after Race 2

Supersport Championship standings

External links
 Superbike Race 1 results
 Superbike Race 2 results
 Supersport Race results

2016 Superbike World Championship season
Superbike World Championship
Superbike World Championship